Saint Pharmutius, (c. 4th century) according to the Prologue from Ohrid, was a hermit in the Egyptian desert
and the spiritual mentor of Venerable John the Hermit of Armenia. Pharmutius' holiness was such that angels brought him his daily bread, which in Christian love he shared with his hermit brother John who lived in strict seclusion.

Saint Pharmutius is remembered along with John the Hermit by the Eastern Orthodox Church on 29 March.

See also

 Christian monasticism
 Stylites

References

External links
 Serbian Orthodox Church

Ascetics
Armenian Christian monks
4th-century Christian saints